Kevin Sullivan may refer to:

Politics 
Kevin J. Sullivan (mayor) (born 1959), Massachusetts politician
Kevin Sullivan (politician) (born 1949), 106th Lieutenant Governor of Connecticut
Kevin Sullivan (communications professional) (born 1958), former White House Director of Communications
Kevin K. Sullivan (born 1964), American diplomat

Academics 
Kevin J. Sullivan (computer scientist), professor of computer science at University of Virginia

Media and arts 
Kevin Sullivan (producer) (born c. 1955), Canadian director and producer of film and television
Kevin Rodney Sullivan (born 1958), actor and film director
Kevin Sullivan (journalist) (born 1959), Pulitzer Prize-winning Washington Post journalist
Kevin Sullivan (artist) (born 1964), performance artist, painter

Sports 
Kevin Sullivan (footballer) (1922–1972), Australian footballer for Collingwood
Kevin Sullivan (wrestler) (born 1949), professional wrestler
Kevin Sullivan (runner) (born 1974), middle-distance runner
Field Medic (born 1991), musician born Kevin Patrick Sullivan

See also 
Kevin O'Sullivan (disambiguation)